The 1999 South Africa Sevens was an annual rugby sevens tournament that took place at the Danie Craven Stadium in Stellenbosch between 10–11 December 1999. It was the first edition of the South Africa Sevens with it being the second leg of the 1999–2000 World Sevens Series. Sixteen teams competed in the tournament and were divided into four groups of four with the top two teams qualifying for the quarter-finals.

The hosts, South Africa were eliminated in the semi-finals before Fiji defeated  New Zealand 12–10 in the final to win their first sevens title for the series. Australia took home the plate while Tonga won the bowl.

Stellenbosch only hosted the South Africa Sevens tournament for one season and the event moved to Durban for the 2000–01 series.

Teams
Sixteen teams competed in the South Africa Sevens with the South African Rugby Union inviting eight teams to fill in the draw. These teams were Georgia, Japan, Kenya, Morocco, Namibia, Tonga, Uruguay and Zimbabwe.

Format
The pool stage was played on the first day of the tournament. The 16 teams were separated into four groups of four teams and teams in the same pool played each other once. The top two teams in each pool advanced to the Cup quarterfinals to compete for the 1999 South Africa Sevens title.

Summary
The opening day of the tournament saw Fiji setting the pace with the team only conceding ten points (against Canada throughout the group stage after comfortably defeating Japan (52–0) and Namibia (56–0) earlier in the day. Dubai champions, New Zealand also won their group despite the slow start over Zimbabwe as they finished ahead over Georgia who had shocked Argentina in the opening match of Pool B. Morocco who was an unknown in the rugby sevens shocked everyone by topping Pool C defeating Australia in the opening game by sevens points before topping the group with wins over France and Tonga. South Africa finished ahead of Samoa in Pool D with the Boks defeating them 12–7 after earlier recordings wins against Kenya and Uruguay.

The second day saw Fiji began with a physically demanding victory over Samoa as they would go on to advance to the cup final defeating Georgia in the semi-finals who had earlier defeated Morocco in the quarter-finals 17–0. They went on to meet New Zealand in the final after they defeated Australia in the quarter-finals and the hosts in the semis. After losing Waisale Serevi through a hand injury, Fiji trailed New Zealand by three points heading into the change over. Filimoni Delasau though would score the match winner as he recorded his 13th try of the tournament and give Fiji the victory 12–10. In the minor placings, Australia defeated Samoa by three points in the plate final with the bowl final being won by Tonga who defeated a fast finishing Argentina squad 31–24.

Pool stage

Pool A

Source: World Rugby

Source: World Rugby

Pool B

Source: World Rugby

Source: World Rugby

Pool C
{| class="wikitable" style="text-align: center;"
|-
!width="200"|Team
!width="40"|Pld
!width="40"|W
!width="40"|D
!width="40"|L
!width="40"|PF
!width="40"|PA
!width="40"|+/-
!width="40"|Pts
|- bgcolor="#ccffcc"
|align=left| 
|3||3||0||0||45||19||+26||9 
|- bgcolor="#ccffcc"
|align=left| 
|3||2||0||1||64||55||+9||7 
|-
|align=left| 
|3||1||0||2||46||52||−6||5
|-
|align=left| 
|3||0||0||3||31||60||−29||3
|}
Source: World Rugby

Source: World Rugby

Pool D

Source: World Rugby

Source: World Rugby

Finals

Bowl

Source: World Rugby

Plate

Source: World Rugby

Cup

Source: World Rugby

Tournament placings

Source: Rugby7.com

References

South Africa Sevens
South Africa Sevens
Sevens